Vidyamoyee Govt. Girls' High School is a girls' public secondary school in Mymensingh, Bangladesh.The school was founded by Jagatkishore Acharya Chowdhury, the son of Vidyamoyee Devvya in 1873 during British Raj.

Foundation
The school was founded by Jagatkishore Acharya Chowdhury, son of Vidyamoyee Devvya, as a gesture of love to his mother. Other financial support came from the zamindars of Muktagacha, Gouripur and Krishnanagar.

History
To keep the memory of his mother alive, Jagatkishore Acharya Chowdhury established Vidyamoyee Girls' High School in the district town in 1873 for female education. Some other landlords of Mymensingh like zamindars of Muktagacha, Gouripur and Krishnanagar came forward with financial support to fulfill the mission of Jagatkishore. At that time women education was in a deplorable state in Bengal but following the establishment of the school, female education in the Bengali community, both Hindu and Muslim, took a positive turn.

The school was nationalised in 1912. The first headmaster of the school was Sree Nabokumar Samaddar who continued his service till 1912. After him Sreemoti Bhakti Sudha Ghosh took over as the head teacher.

The school has a number of memories to recollect. One is the visit of Nobel Laureate poet Rabindranath Tagore to the school in 1926. Miss R.B. Verulkar, a Scottish woman who received an M.A. from St. Andrews University, Scotland, was head of the school at that time. The visit of this great poet is regarded as a glorious part of history of Mymensingh region. Sreemoti Bibhubala Bakshi succeeded Miss Verulkar in June 1928, serving in an officiating capacity until she was confirmed as permanent headmistress in May 1930. She served the school as head for 25 years.

The school has a library with over 5,000 books with some rare collections. It has a hostel with accommodation for over 100 students. The hostel was established in 1896 for students coming from distant villages. It was used only for Hindu students.

Today the school is run by 50 teachers, including two assistant headmasters. The school runs two shifts- morning and day.

See also
Mymensingh Zilla School
Ishwarganj Bisweswari Pilot High school

References

External links
 

Schools in Mymensingh District
1873 establishments in India
Education in Mymensingh
Educational institutions established in 1873
Girls' schools in Bangladesh